Dunalley Bay refers to a bay on the North East aspect of Norfolk Bay, which lies adjacent to Dunalley, Tasmania, the largest town of Norfolk Bay

References

Bays of Tasmania